Clarence Hobart and Harold Nisbet defeated Herbert Roper Barrett and Arthur Gore 6–4, 6–1, 8–6 in the All Comers' Final, but the reigning champions Laurence Doherty and Reginald Doherty defeated Hobart and Nisbet 7–5, 6–0, 6–2 in the challenge round to win the gentlemen's doubles tennis title at the 1899 Wimbledon Championships.

Draw

Challenge round

All Comers'

References

External links

Men's Doubles
Wimbledon Championship by year – Men's doubles